Frank Toledo (born April 12, 1970) is an American boxer who held the International Boxing Federation (IBF) featherweight championship in 2001.

Biography
Toledo, born in Newark, New Jersey, fought out of Paterson, New Jersey. He became a professional boxer in 1989. In 1993 and 1994, he defeated future world champions Clarence "Bones" Adams and Hector Acero Sanchez. In 1995, he fought Marco Antonio Barrera for Barrera's World Boxing Organization super bantamweight title. Barrera knocked him out in the second round.

In 1999, he defeated former IBF bantamweight champion Orlando Canizales, though in 2000, he lost to former champion Manuel Medina. On April 6, 2001, he defeated Mbulelo Botile for the IBF featherweight title. He did not hold the title long, as he lost it on November 11 of that year to former foe Medina. He continued fighting until 2004, but never fought for a world title again.

References

External links
 

1970 births
Living people
World boxing champions
Featherweight boxers
International Boxing Federation champions
Boxers from Newark, New Jersey
Sportspeople from Paterson, New Jersey
American male boxers